General Willis may refer to:

Edward Willis (British Army officer) (1870–1961), British Army major general
Frederick Willis (British Army officer) (1827–1899), British Army lieutenant general
George Willis (British Army officer) (1823–1900), British Army general